() is a county of Zhangzhou City, in the far south of Fujian province, People's Republic of China

The county comprises most of the lower watershed of the Jiulong River's north branch and has long been a transport corridor. The first rail connection to the port of Xiamen, laid during the Great Leap Forward era, came down this valley.

The county seat is Huafeng. East of there, up a tributary valley, is Xiandu town, which features some prime examples of Tulou and Fujian Tulou.

Climate

Administrative divisions
Towns:
Huafeng, Fengshan, Shajian, Xinxu, Gao'an, Xiandu

Townships:
Makeng Township, Hulin Township, Gaoche Township

References

County-level divisions of Fujian
Zhangzhou